Little Salkeld is a small village and former civil parish, now in the parish of Hunsonby, in the Eden district of Cumbria, England, a few miles to the north east of Penrith. In 1931 the civil parish had a population of 91.

History

The manor at Little Salkeld was confirmed by King Edward I in 1292. It is believed to be the original home of the Salkeld family of landowners.

Little Salkeld was formerly a township in Addingham parish, from 1866 Little Salkeld was a civil parish in its own right until it was abolished on 1 April 1934 and merged with Hunsonby and Winskill to create Hunsonby.

Places of interest

Little Salkeld Watermill, built in 1745, is a traditional English 18th-century water mill. It is Cumbria's only watermill still in full operation.

Salkeld Hall is the village's largest house; built in the 16th century incorporating earlier walls. It is privately owned.

The village contains a vicarage but no church - it was built for Addingham parish church one mile to the north near Glassonby.

Popular with walkers it is the closest village to Lacy's Caves and Long Meg and Her Daughters.

Transport

Little Salkeld can be reached by car 1½ miles from Langwathby off the A686, approximately 6 miles from M6 J40.

It lies on the C2C Cycle Route.

Little Salkeld railway station on the Settle-Carlisle Railway and branch line to the Long Meg Mine were both closed in the 1970s, although the disused platforms still remain and the station building is well maintained as a private house. In 1918 the Little Salkeld rail accident in nearby Long Meg Cutting killed seven people. A second accident occurred at the station in 1933, which resulted in the death of one railwayman and injuries to a further five members of railway staff and thirty passengers.

The village is believed to have been connected at one time by a bridge over the River Eden to Great Salkeld.

See also

Listed buildings in Hunsonby

References

External links
 Cumbria County History Trust: Little Salkeld (nb: provisional research only – see Talk page)

Villages in Cumbria
Former civil parishes in Cumbria
Hunsonby
Watermills in Cumbria